Elections were held in Illinois on Tuesday, November 5, 1968.

Primaries were held on June 11, 1968.

Election information

Turnout
In the primary, turnout was 28.84% with 1,573,173 ballots cast (833,498 Democrat and 739,675 Republican).

In the general election, turnout was 82.91% with 4,705,852 ballots cast.

Federal elections

United States President 

Illinois voted for the Republican ticket of Richard Nixon and Spiro Agnew.

United States Senate 

Incumbent Senator Everett M. Dirksen, a Republican, won reelection to a fourth term.

United States House 

All 24 Illinois seats in the United States House of Representatives were up for election in 1968.

No seats switched parties, leaving the Illinois House delegation to continue to consist of 12 Democrats and 12 Republicans.

State elections

Governor

Incumbent Democratic Governor Samuel H. Shapiro, lost reelection to Republican Richard B. Ogilvie.

Lieutenant Governor

Democrat Paul Simon was elected to serve as lieutenant governor. 

This was the only time in Illinois history that the state had the elected a governor and a lieutenant governor from different political parties (there were, however, instances in Illinois where an appointed lieutenant governor had been of a different political party than the governor).

Due to changes implemented by the passage of the 1970 Constitution of Illinois, in all subsequent elections, gubernatorial and lieutenant gubernatorial candidates have been jointly elected on a ticket. Therefore, this was the last Illinois election held for the sole purpose of electing a lieutenant governor.

Democratic primary

Republican primary

General election

Attorney General 

Incumbent Attorney General William G. Clark, a Democrat, did not seek a third term. Republican William J. Scott was elected to succeed him.

Democratic primary

Republican primary

General election

Secretary of State 

Incumbent Secretary of State Paul Powell, a Democrat, was reelected to a second term.

Democratic primary

Republican primary

General election

Auditor of Public Accounts 

Incumbent Auditor of Public Accounts Michael Howlett, a Democrat, was reelected to a third term.

Democratic primary

Republican primary

General election

Clerk of the Supreme Court 

The Clerk of the Supreme Court was Cleli Woods, who took office after the death in office of Fae Searcy earlier in 1968.

The 1970 Constitution of Illinois made it so that the office would become an appointive office by 1975, thus rendering the 1968 election the last instance in which an election was held for this office.

Democratic primary

Republican primary
Incumbent Clerk of the Supreme Court Fae Searcy died in office on March 25, 1968. However, she had already filed to be on the ballot before her death. Instead of being listed by her own name, Fae Searcy opted to be listed on the ballot as "Ms. Earle Benjamin Searcy". Searcy remained on the ballot, and received 32% of the vote, despite being dead. However, Justin Taft outperformed her, with 45.01% of the vote, winning the nomination.

General election

State Senate
Seats of the Illinois Senate were up for election in 1968. Republicans retained control of the chamber.

State House of Representatives
Seats in the Illinois House of Representatives were up for election in 1968. Republicans retained control of the chamber.

Trustees of University of Illinois

An election using cumulative voting was held for three of nine seats for Trustees of University of Illinois system. 

The election saw the reelection of incumbent third-term Republican Timothy W. Swain and incumbent second-term Republican member Earl M. Hughes and the election of new Republican member Russell W. "Ruck" Steger.

Incumbent Democrat Kenney E. Williamson (appointed in 1967 after the death in office of Wayne A. Johnston) lost reelection.

Judicial elections
Judicial elections were held, including two elections to fill vacancies on the Illinois Appellate Court.

Ballot measures
Three ballot measures were up for election in 1968, a legislatively referred state statute, a bond measure, and a call for a constitutional convention.

In order to be approved, legislatively referred state statues required the support of a majority of those voting on the statute. Bond measures needed a vote equal to majority of the votes cast for whichever chamber of the Illinois General Assembly had the highest cumulative vote count. A call for a constitutional convention required votes equal to a majority of the all ballots cast in the general election.

Illinois Banking Act
Illinois Banking Act was approved by voters as a legislatively referred state statue. It enabled Illinois state banks to have foreign branches.

Illinois Natural Resources Development Bond Act
Illinois Natural Resources Development Bond Act, a legislatively referred bond question, failed to pass. It proposed a $1 billion bond act for the development of natural resources.

Bond measures needed a vote equal to majority of the votes cast for whichever chamber of the Illinois General Assembly had the highest cumulative vote count. In this election, the highest turnout for a chamber's elections was 4,268,956, so the needed vote total for the measure to have pass would have been 2,134,479.

Proposed call for a Constitutional Convention
In 1968, voters were presented with a referendum on whether or not to call a constitutional convention. This was the first such vote held in the State of Illinois since 1934. The chief sponsor of the legislation which created this ballot measure was Senate Republican leader W. Russell Arrington. Democratic Governor Otto Kerner Jr. was supportive of holding a constitutional convention.

The call for the constitutional required the votes of an equal majority of all ballots cast in the 1968 general elections.

A constitutional convention was subsequently held, and the resulting Constitution of Illinois was approved by Illinois voters in a 1970 special election.

Local elections
Local elections were held.

References

 
Illinois